Nikita Olegovich Koldunov (born 19 April 2000) is a Russian football player who plays for FC Chayka Peschanokopskoye.

Club career
He is a product of the academy of FC Zenit Saint Petersburg and was first included in their Russian Premier League roster for the 2016–17 season. For the next three seasons, he played for their Under-20 squad, without making any appearances for the senior team. In the summer of 2019, he was one of 10 players that transferred from Zenit to the Russian Premier League newcomer PFC Sochi.

He made his debut in the Russian Premier League for Sochi on 8 December 2019 in a game against FC Rubin Kazan. He substituted Nikita Burmistrov in the 62nd minute.

On 12 February 2021, he joined FC Zenit-2 Saint Petersburg on loan.

On 30 July 2021 he returned to FC Zenit-2 Saint Petersburg on a one-year contract.

References

External links
 
 
 

2000 births
Footballers from Saint Petersburg
Living people
Russian footballers
Association football midfielders
PFC Sochi players
FC Zenit-2 Saint Petersburg players
FC Chayka Peschanokopskoye players
Russian Premier League players
Russian Second League players